Derek Leaver FRSE MRSC ARIC (16 May 1929 – 24 October 1990) was a 20th-century British chemist.

Life

He was born on 16 May 1929 in Lancashire. He was educated at Nelson Grammar School then studied science at the University of Leeds graduating with a BSc in 1949. He completed his postgraduate doctorate (PhD) in 1953. He then served two years National Service, 1953 to 1955.

In 1955 he moved to Scotland to begin lecturing at the University of Edinburgh, and was promoted to Reader in 1972. He remained with the University until he retired. In 1962 he oversaw the PhD of Dr David Vass.

In 1975 he was elected a Fellow of the Royal Society of Edinburgh. His proposers were Sir Edmund Langley Hirst, Neil Campbell, Sir John Cadogan, and Duncan Taylor.

He died on 24 October 1990 following a long illness.

Family

In 1960 he married Pam Goldman and had four sons.

References

1929 births
1990 deaths
British chemists
People from Nelson, Lancashire
Alumni of the University of Leeds
Academics of the University of Edinburgh
Fellows of the Royal Society of Edinburgh
Scientists from Lancashire